Combremont may refer to:

Combremont-le-Grand, Vaud, Switzerland
Combremont-le-Petit, Vaud, Switzerland